This article is a list of episodes from the television show Space Battleship Yamato in order by production number.

Episodes

References